Thesbia is a genus of sea snails, marine gastropod mollusks in the family Raphitomidae.

The genus was named after Thesbia, one of the Sea-nymphs of Hesiod.

Description
(Original description) The outer lip is thin and smooth. The apex of the spire is irregularly coiled.

Species
Species within the genus Thesbia include:
 Thesbia dyscrita (Watson, 1881)
 Thesbia michaelseni (Strebel, 1905)
 Thesbia nana (Lovén, 1846)
 Thesbia unica Sysoev, 1988
Species brought into synonymy
 Thesbia albus Mac Andrew & Forbes, 1847: synonym of Thesbia nana (Lovén, 1846)
 Thesbia algoensis Thiele, 1925: synonym of Glyptanachis algoensis (Thiele, 1925): synonym of Decipifus algoensis (Thiele, 1925)
 † Thesbia antiselli (Anderson & Martin, 1914): synonym of † Xenuroturris antiselli (F. Anderson & B. Martin, 1914)
 Thesbia filostriata Strebel, 1905: synonym of Typhlodaphne filostriata (Strebel, 1905)
 Thesbia folini Locard, 1897: synonym of Xanthodaphne leptalea (Bush, 1893)
 Thesbia innocens E. A. Smith, 1907: synonym of Falsimohnia innocens (E. A. Smith, 1907)
 Thesbia nanum Lovén, 1846: synonym of Thesbia nana (Lovén, 1846)
 Thesbia nudator Locard, 1897: synonym of Bathybela nudator (Locard, 1897)
 Thesbia ohlini Strebel, 1905: synonym of Pleurotomella ohlini (Strebel, 1905)

References

 Bouchet P. & Rocroi J.-P. (2010). Nomenclator of Molluscan Supraspecific Names

External links
 Bouchet, P.; Kantor, Y. I.; Sysoev, A.; Puillandre, N. (2011). A new operational classification of the Conoidea (Gastropoda). Journal of Molluscan Studies. 77(3): 273-308
 
 Worldwide Mollusc Species Data Base: Raphitomidae

 
Raphitomidae
Gastropod genera